Hibes Montes is a mountain range on the planet Mars, consisting of a northwestern and southeastern peak rising above Elysium Planitia. The name Hibes Montes is a classical albedo name. This was approved by International Astronomical Union in 1985.

See also
 List of mountains on Mars

References

External links 
 Gazetteer of Planetary Nomenclature

Mountain ranges on Mars